The 1909 Navy Midshipmen football team represented the United States Naval Academy during the 1909 college football season. In their second season under Frank Berrien, the Midshipmen compiled a  record and outscored their opponents by a combined score of 99 to 42.

Schedule

References

Navy
Navy Midshipmen football seasons
Navy Midshipmen football